Shakliar Warjri is an Indian politician from Hill State People's Democratic Party(HSPDP). He is member of the Meghalaya Legislative Assembly from Mawthadraishan.

2023 Meghalaya Assembly Election 
He successfully contested the election on the HSPDP ticket. He was one of two successful HSPDP candidates.

He pledged support to Conrad Sangma led government. He was appointed as a Cabinet Minister in Second Conrad Sangma ministry.

References 

Indian politicians
Living people
Year of birth missing (living people)